In radio and telecommunication, a traveling-wave antenna is a class of antenna that uses a traveling wave on a guiding structure as the main radiating mechanism. Its distinguishing feature is that the radio-frequency current that generates the radio waves travels through the antenna in one direction.  This is in contrast to a resonant antenna, such as the monopole or dipole, in which the antenna acts as a resonator, with radio currents traveling in both directions, bouncing back and forth between the ends of the antenna.  An advantage of traveling wave antennas is that since they are nonresonant they often have a wider bandwidth than resonant antennas.  Common types of traveling wave antenna are the Beverage antenna, axial-mode helical antenna, and rhombic antenna.

Traveling-wave antennas fall into two general categories: slow-wave antennas, and fast-wave antennas.  Fast-wave antennas are often referred to as leaky wave antenna.

See also

 Axial mode helical antenna
 Beverage antenna
 Dipole and monopole antennas
 Leaky wave antenna
 Rhombic antenna
 Shortwave broadband antenna

References
 C. H. Walter, Traveling Wave Antennas, McGraw-Hill, 1965, Dover, 1970, reprinted by Peninsula Publishing, Los Altos, California, 1990.
 T. Rozzi and M. Mongiardo, Open Electromagnetic Waveguides, The Institution of Electrical Engineers(IEE), London, 1997.
 M. J. Ablowitz and A. S. Fokas, Complex variables: Introduction and Applications, second edition, Cambridge University Press, 2003.
 A. A. Oliner and T. Tamir, "Guided complex wave, part I: field at an interface", Proc. IEE, Vol. 110, pp. 310-324, February 1963.
 A. A. Oliner and T. Tamir, "Guided complex wave, part II: relation to radiation pattern", Proc. IEE, Vol. 110, pp. 325–334, February 1963.
 A. Hessel, "General characteristics of traveling-wave antennas", Chapter 19 in Antenna Theory, R. E. Collin and F. J. Zucker, Editors, McGraw-Hill, New York, 1969.

Antennas (radio)